Susumu Yokota (横田 進 Yokota Susumu, or ススム・ヨコタ Susumu Yokota; born 1960 or 1961 – March 27, 2015) was a Japanese composer. He released several albums under pseudonyms including Stevia, Ebi, and others.

Yokota worked as an economist before beginning to work as a DJ and producer. Yokota was well known in the English-speaking independent music scene for his albums of experimental ambient music, including albums like Acid Mt. Fuji and Sakura. He also had a long career as a house music DJ and released several highly regarded albums of house music.

Death
Susumu Yokota died on March 27, 2015, aged 54, after a long period of illness.

Discography

External links
 Susumu Yokota on The Leaf Label
 
 
 
 Susumu Yokota at Exceptional Records

References

1960s births
Year of birth uncertain
2015 deaths
Ambient musicians
Japanese composers
Japanese electronic musicians
Japanese male composers